{{Infobox given name
| name = Ismail
| image=
| imagesize=
| caption=
| pronunciation = 
| gender = Male
| language        = Arabic
| meaning = Heard by God
| region = 
|  languageorigin  = Arabic
| related names = Hebrew ישמעאל “Ishmael”
| alternative spelling = Esmail
| footnotes = 
}}

Ismail ( or) is an Arabic given name. It corresponds to the English name Ishmael.

Etymology and meaning
The literal translation of the name Ismail'' is "heard by God" and according to Abrahamic tradition, it refers to the yearning of Abraham and his wife, Sarah, to have a child. Ismail's mother, however, was not Sarah, but Hagar, Sarah's maidservant, who Sarah gave to Abraham as a concubine because she was unable to have a child. Sarah later does give birth to a son, Isaac. 

According to Genesis, the name is given by God as He heard the cries of Hagar who had been mistreated by Sarah after becoming pregnant and run away.

According to Islamic tradition, Ismail's mother, Hagar was also a full wife of the Prophet Abraham.

Given name
Ismail, son of Ibrahim
 Isma'il ibn Musa al-Hadi was an Abbasid prince, son of caliph Al-Hadi (r. 785–786). Nephew and son-in-law of caliph Harun al-Rashid (r. 786–809).
 Isma'il ibn Jaʽfar al-Mutawakkil, was an Abbasid prince, son of caliph Al-Mutawakkil (r. 847—861).
Saint Ismael Orthodox Christian Saint
Ignatius Ismail, Syriac Orthodox patriarch of Mardin
Ismail I (1487–1524), the first king and founder of the Safavid dynasty
Ismail II (r. 1576–1577) third King of Safavid State.
Ismail Abdul Rahman, Malaysian politician; former Deputy Prime Minister of Malaysia
Ismail Abu Shanab (1950–2003), Hamas politician
İsmail Acar (born 1971), Turkish painter
Ismail Akbay (1930–2003), Turkish scientist
Ismail Amat (1935–2018), Chinese politician
Ismail al-Armouti (died 2013), Jordanian politician
Esmail Babolian, Iranian numerical analyst
Ismail Balkhi (1918–1968), Afghan politician
Ismail bin Mail, Malaysian inventor of 2 for 1 ringgit
Isma'il Beg, Uyghur rebel leader
İsmail Beşikçi, Turkish scholar
Esmail Davarfar, Iranian actor
İsmail Enver, Turkish military officer
Ismail Ebrahim (1946–2020), South African cricketer
Ismail Fahmi, Egyptian diplomat
İsmail Güldüren, Turkish footballer
Ismail Al Hammadi, Emirati footballer
Ismail Haniyeh, Palestinian politician
Ismail Hoxha, Albanian politician Professor Ph.D University " La Sapienza" Rome
Isma'il ibn Jafar, Imam of Ismaili Shia's
Ismail Kadare (born 1936), Albanian novelist, poet, essayist, and playwright
İsmail Kartal, Turkish footballer
İsmail Keleş (born 1988), Turkish sport shooter
Ismail Khan, 16th-century Bengali nobleman
İsmail Köybaşı, Turkish footballer
Esmail Koushan, Iranian film director
Ismail Marzuki, Indonesian composer, songwriter, and musician
Esmail Merat, Iranian politician
İsmail Ogan, Turkish sport wrestler
İsmail Özdağlar (born 1950), Turkish politician and former government minister
Isma'il Pasha (1830–1895), Wali and khedive of Egypt
Ismail Patel, British optician
Ismail Samani, Amir of the Samanids
Ismail Ibn Sharif, Moroccan sultan
Esmail Shooshtari, Iranian politician
Ismail Siddiq (1830–1876), Egyptian politician
Ismail Tiliwaldi, Chinese politician
Ismail Tipi (1959–2013), Turkish-born German journalist and politician
İsmail Türüt, Turkish singer
Ismail Qemali, distinguished leader of the Albanian national movement
Esmail Zanjani, American academic
Ismail ibn Musa Menk, Grand Mufti of Zimbabwe

Middle name
Ahmad ibn Isma'il ibn Ali al-Hashimi was provincial governor who was active in the late eighth century.
Ahmad Ismail Ali (1917–1974), Egyptian army officer

Surname or patronymic
 Abu Isma'il ibn Harun, was the son of Abbasid caliph Harun al-Rashid
 Ahmed Abu Ismail (1915–2013), Egyptian economist and politician
Abdul Fattah Ismail (1934-1986), Yemeni politician
Atik Ismail (born 1957), Finnish footballer
Dhurgham Ismail, Iraqi football player
Gulalai Ismail, Pashtun women's rights activist
Hamid Ismail, Qatari footballer
Hesham Ismail, American football player
Mohammed Ismail, Afghan Guantanamo Bay detainee
Mourad Ismail, Egyptian Mathematician
Mustafa Ismail, Egyptian Qur'an reciter
Mustafa Osman Ismail, Sudanese politician
Nabawi Ismail, Egyptian politician
Ibrahim Artan Ismail Somali politician, former Minister of Security of Puntland
Qadry Ismail, an NCAA and NFL football player
Raghib "Rocket" Ismail, an NCAA and NFL football player
Rami Ismail, Dutch game developer
Salma Ismail (1918–2014), Malaysian doctor
Sam Esmail, Egyptian-American screenwriter
Sariamin Ismail, Indonesian novelist
Shabnim Ismail (born 1988), South African cricketer
Shaker Ismail, Iraqi football player
Sherif Ismail (1955–2023), Egyptian engineer and politician
Sulaiman Ismail, an Arena Football League player
Taufiq Ismail, Indonesian poet and activist
Usmar Ismail, director and pioneer of Indonesian film

See also
Sultan Ismail (disambiguation)
Ismail (disambiguation)

Arabic masculine given names
Iranian masculine given names
Bosniak masculine given names
Bosnian masculine given names
Turkish masculine given names
Arabic-language surnames
Albanian masculine given names